Ennada is a genus of moths in the family Geometridae.

Species
 Ennada blanchardi Parra & Alvear, 2009
 Ennada flavaria Blanchard, 1852
 Ennada pellicata (Felder & Rogenhofer 1875)

References
 Revision of the genus Ennada Blanchard (Lepidoptera:Geometridae), 2009
 Ennada at Markku Savela's Lepidoptera and Some Other Life Forms
 Natural History Museum Lepidoptera genus database

Larentiini
Geometridae genera